The Boone County Journal is a small Democratic newspaper that serves Boone County and is headquartered in the city of Ashland, Missouri. Ashland is a small town in Boone County which exists in central Missouri. Boone County is home to Columbia, Missouri which houses the University of Missouri and has a population of about 178, 271 people. The newspaper is released weekly by editor and owner Bruce Wallace. Advertised as Southern Boone County's primary news source, this newspaper is released each Wednesday to an audience of 2,560 readers.

Ownership and history 
The Boone County Journal was founded in by Dan Fichel in 1969. There were three ownership changes before the current owners, Gene Rhorer  bought the newspaper in 2019. Bruce Wallace is now the newspaper's own publisher, editor, owner, advertising manager, photographer, and distributor. Susan Wallace oversees the book-keeping and business aspect of the publication. There are three columnists and one news clerk who currently work at the paper.

Coverage 
Abigail Perano with the Missourian wrote a story about the Boone County Journal's owner, Bruce Wallace in November 2017. The story featured Bruce Wallace and his involvement with the Boone County Journal.

Paper sections 
The paper consists of six sections: news, sports, opinion, obituaries, classifieds, and “Your Health.” The “Your Health” section of the newspaper consists of reminders for the citizens and research findings in the University of Missouri. A major point in the sports section of the newspaper is called “Eagles Football” and contains updates and stories about the Southern Boon high school football team. Also under the sports tab is a section titled MU Tigers which consists of updates about University of Missouri sports.

References

External links
 Facebook

Ashland, Missouri
Boone County, Missouri
Newspapers published in Missouri